Maghuiyeh-ye Sofla (also Romanized as Maghū’īyeh-ye Soflá; also known as Moghūeeyeh-ye Soflá) is a village in Kiskan Rural District, in the Central District of Baft County, Kerman Province, Iran. At the 2006 census, its population was 239, in 56 families.

References 

Populated places in Baft County